The Gunns are a professional wrestling tag team, consisting of real-life brothers Austin and Colten Gunn, the sons of professional wrestler Billy Gunn. They are currently competing for All Elite Wrestling (AEW), where they are the reigning World Tag Team Champions in their first reign.

Austin and Billy first began teaming on the independent circuit in 2017, before Austin debuted for AEW as Billy's tag team partner in 2020. The two began teaming as The Gunn Club. They became a trio later that year when Colten debuted in AEW and joined the group and they teamed for the next two years, until Austin and Colten turned on Billy in favor of siding with Stokely Hathaway. They soon ceased using the Gunn Club name and began referring themselves as simply "The Gunns". They achieved major success in 2023, winning the World Tag Team Championship.

History

Independent circuit (2017–present)
Austin Gunn made his professional wrestling debut on March 18, 2017, by teaming with his father Billy Gunn at a Sunbelt Wrestling Entertainment event against Adam Rose, Deimos and Justin Oversheet in a handicap match, which Austin and Billy won. The father and son duo teamed with each other on a few more occasions on the independent circuit.

Austin and Colten Gunn would win their first professional wrestling championship at a New South Wrestling event Resurrection on March 11, 2022, where they defeated TME (Duke Davis and Ganon Jones Jr.) to win the New South Tag Team Championship. Two weeks later, at Royal Glory, they lost the titles to The Bad News Boyz (Brandon Tate and Brent Tate) in a three-way match, also involving Facade and James Storm.

All Elite Wrestling

The Gunn Club (2020–2022)

Billy Gunn joined the upstart promotion All Elite Wrestling from the very beginning in 2019, as a producer and an occasional on-screen talent. His son Austin debuted for AEW in a non-televised match during a taping of Dark on January 1, 2020, as Austin and Billy defeated Preston Vance and Shawn Spears. Austin's televised debut in AEW occurred on the January 14 episode of Dark, as Austin and Billy, known as "The Gunn Club", defeated Peter Avalon and Shawn Spears. Gunn Club established themselves as fan favorites, winning their earlier matches on Dark throughout the year, until the September 15 episode of Dark, where they teamed with Private Party (Isaiah Kassidy and Marq Quen) against The Dark Order (Alex Reynolds, Evil Uno, John Silver and Stu Grayson) in an eight-man tag team match, which Dark Order won. Gunn Club's first match as a team on Dynamite occurred on November 4, where they teamed with Cody Rhodes to defeat Dark Order members Colt Cabana, John Silver and Ten in a six-man tag team match.

On the November 17 episode of Dark, Gunn Club expanded to a trio as Billy's elder son Colten made his professional wrestling debut by teaming with Billy and Austin to defeat Bshp King, Joey O'Riley and Sean Maluta. Austin and Colten made their pay-per-view debut at Revolution on March 7, 2021, by participating in a Casino Tag Team Royale as the #5 and #6 entrants, for a future AEW World Tag Team Championship opportunity. They were both eliminated by Q. T. Marshall. Gunn Club enjoyed a successful run on Dark throughout 2021, winning all of their tag team and six-man tag team matches. Their success continued in 2022, resulting in Austin and Colten topping AEW's tag team rankings on February 9, with a tag team record of 3-0 in 2022. As a result, Austin and Colten earned a World Tag Team Championship opportunity against Jurassic Express (Jungle Boy and Luchasaurus) on the February 11 episode of Rampage, which they failed to win. Austin and Colten would fail in subsequent #1 contender's matches on the February 23 and March 2 episodes of Dynamite to earn another opportunity at the titles.

During this time, Gunn Club transitioned into villains by forming an alliance with The Acclaimed (Anthony Bowens and Max Caster). Caster began teaming with Gunn Club more frequently after Bowens suffered a knee injury in May. They began appearing more on Dynamite and Rampage, beginning with the June 1 episode of Dynamite, where they lost to CM Punk and FTR (Cash Wheeler and Dax Harwood). On the Road Rager episode of Rampage, Caster and Gunn Club defeated Ruffin It (Bear Boulder, Bear Bronson and Leon Ruffin). At AEW x NJPW: Forbidden Door, the entire Gunn Club trio teamed with Caster to defeat Alex Coughlin, Kevin Knight, The DKC and Yuya Uemura. 

On the Blood and Guts episode of Dynamite, Caster and Gunn Club lost to Danhausen and FTR, after Bowens accidentally hit Austin with his crutch. Austin and Colten confronted Acclaimed after the match and left the ring, while Billy stayed with Acclaimed. The following week, on Dynamite, Acclaimed and Gunn Club defeated Fuego Del Sol and Ruffin It in an eight-man tag team match. However, Billy attacked Acclaimed after the match due to dissension between both teams. This would result in Gunn Club facing Acclaimed in a dumpster match on the August 3 episode of Dynamite, which Gunn Club lost. Billy tried to reconcile with Austin and Colten on the August 17 episode of Dynamite but Stokely Hathaway appeared on the stage and Austin and Colten turned on Billy by attacking him and siding with Hathaway, which resulted in Acclaimed making the save and forming an alliance with Billy. This marked Billy's removal from the Gunn Club.

The Gunns (2022–present)

Austin and Colten resumed their alliance with Stokely Hathaway, as they joined his group of wrestlers including Big Bill, Lee Moriarty and Ethan Page, who interfered in the Casino Battle Royale at All Out, to clear the field for the Joker, revealed to be the returning Maxwell Jacob Friedman, who went on to win the match. On the September 14 episode of Dynamite, the new alliance was named "The Firm". On the October 17 episode of Dark: Elevation, Gunn Club began referring themselves to as "The Gunns", as they defeated The Bollywood Boyz (Gurv Sihra and Harv Sihra). Gunns began mocking FTR by impersonating them during their matches, leading to a match between both teams at the Holiday Bash episode of Dynamite, which Gunns won.

On the February 8 episode of Dynamite, Gunns defeated The Acclaimed to win the AEW World Tag Team Championship. Gunns successfully defended the titles against Acclaimed, Jay Lethal and Jeff Jarrett, and Orange Cassidy and Danhausen in a four-way match at Revolution. They name-dropped FTR among the teams they had beaten, during a post-match interview, which led to FTR returning to AEW and attacking Gunns.

Championships and accomplishments
All Elite Wrestling
AEW World Tag Team Championship (1 time, current)

New South Wrestling
New South Tag Team Championship (1 time)

References

External links
The Gunns profiles at Cagematch, Internet Wrestling Database

All Elite Wrestling teams and stables
Independent promotions teams and stables
All Elite Wrestling personnel